Marcelo Gonçalves Costa Lopes, usually known simply as Marcelo Gonçalves (born 22 February 1966 in Rio de Janeiro, Rio de Janeiro state) is a Brazilian former footballer who played as a central defender. He was effective on low balls, and was well known because of his long hair, a recognisable hairstyle which he wore for most of his career, and which he only cut during the 1997 FIFA Confederations Cup, when all the Brazilian players entered the field in the semifinal match with shaved heads.

Club career
Gonçalves started his career at Flamengo in 1987. However, he rose to fame playing for Botafogo and was first called up to play for the Brazilian national team with the latter club.

In addition to playing for Botafogo and Flamengo, Gonçalves also played for Santa Cruz, Cruzeiro, Internacional, and Mexican club Tecos. With Botafogo he won the Brazilian championship in 1995, the Carioca championship in 1990 and in 1997, and the Rio-São Paulo championship in 1998; with Tecos (Universidad Autónoma de Guadalajara), he won the Mexican championship in 1994, and the CONCACAF Cup Winners' Cup in 1995.

He scored the match-winning goal for Botafogo in the club's 1–0 win against Vasco da Gama in the 1997 Taça Guanabara final. Gonçalves also played for Cruzeiro in the club's 2–0 defeat to German side Borussia Dortmund in the 1997 Intercontinental Cup final.

International career
At international level, Gonçalves won the Copa América with the Brazilian national team in 1997, as well as the Confederations Cup in the same year. He was mainly a reserve player in Brazil's squad during the 1998 FIFA World Cup, appearing against Norway and Chile, as the team went on to reach the final. In total, he was capped 24 times for Brazil, scoring just one goal.

After football
Gonçalves is currently the executive director of Estácio de Sá, a Rio de Janeiro football club.

References
 Much of the content of this article comes from the equivalent Portuguese-language Wikipedia article (retrieved December 26, 2005).

External links
  (archive)

1966 births
Living people
Brazilian footballers
Brazilian expatriate footballers
Association football central defenders
Sport Club Internacional players
CR Flamengo footballers
Botafogo de Futebol e Regatas players
Cruzeiro Esporte Clube players
Tecos F.C. footballers
1997 Copa América players
1997 FIFA Confederations Cup players
1998 CONCACAF Gold Cup players
1998 FIFA World Cup players
FIFA Confederations Cup-winning players
Brazil international footballers
Expatriate footballers in Mexico
Copa América-winning players
Footballers from Rio de Janeiro (city)